Petra is the Nabataean kingdom capital's archeological site, carved in the desert rock of (Trans)Jordan.

Petra, PETRA or Petria may also refer to :

Places and jurisdictions

Mediterranean 
Greece
 Petra (Corinthia), a town of ancient Corinthia
 Petra (Elis), a town of ancient Elis
 Petra, Boeotia, a village and community of the Aliartos municipality
 Petra, Lesbos, a village and former municipality on the island of Lesbos
 Petra, Pieria, a former municipality in Pieria regional unit
 Petra, Preveza, a village in Preveza regional unit

Other 
 Petra (Illyria), a town of ancient Illyricum, now in Albania
 Petra (Lycaonia), a town of ancient Lycaonia, now in Turkey
 Petra in Aegypto, a Hellenistic city and former bishopric in Aegyptus Primus, now Hagar-En-Nauatiyeh (Egypt) and a Latin Catholic titular see
 Petra, Cyprus, a former intercommunal village in Northern Cyprus
 Petra, Majorca, a town in Balearic Spain

Elsewhere 
Black Sea
 Petra, Lazica, alias Petra in Lazica, a Roman fortress, settlement and former bishopric in Colchis, modern Georgia, now a Latin Catholic titular see
 Petra, a village in Bâcleș Commune, Mehedinţi County, Romania

Other 
 Petra, Kentucky, an unincorporated community in the US

People 
 Petra (given name)

Arts and entertainment
 Petra (band), a Christian rock band
 Petra (album), their debut album
 Petra (film), a 2018 Spanish film
 Petra (sculpture), a 2010 sculpture by Marcel Walldorf
 Petra (TV series), a 2020 Italian TV crime series

Business
 Petra (agency), Jordanian news agency
PETRA (Positron-Electron Tandem Ring Accelerator), a particle accelerator
Petra Airlines, former airline based in Amman, Jordan
 Petra Bank, bankrupt Jordanian bank
 Petra Diamonds, diamond mining company
 SS Petra, a West German merchant ship

Other uses 
 Petra (dog), a dog on the British children's TV programme Blue Peter
 Petra High School, an independent school in Bulawayo, Zimbabwe
 Petra (swan), an animal who become famous in 2006 for falling in love with a pedalo
 Petria (brachiopod), a brachiopod genus
 Petra, database system used by the UK Citizens Advice Bureau from 2011

See also 
 Petra tou Romiou, a sea stack in Pafos, Cyprus
 Pietra (disambiguation)
 Peter (name)
 Petroleum
 Petrus (disambiguation)
 Peta-